Moișa may refer to several places in Romania:

 Moișa, a village in Glodeni Commune, Mureș County
 Moișa, a village in Boroaia Commune, Suceava County
 Moișa (Râșca), a tributary of the Râșca in Suceava County